Hermann Ludwig Husslein (born 12 September 1985) is a Thai slalom canoeist who competes in the K-1 event. He won a bronze medal at the 2018 Asian Games, placing fourth in 2010 and 2014. At the 2012 Olympics he finished 19th in the heats and failed to qualify for the semifinals.

Husslein he is thai german of mixed ethnicity. He has a degree in mechanical engineering from the Augsburg University of Applied Sciences. In 2012 he became the first Olympic athlete representing Thailand in canoe slalom. He trains in Europe, but also works for the Rowing and Canoeing Association of Thailand. He is involved in a project to build an artificial course in southern Bangkok, in time for the 2020 Olympic qualifiers.

World Cup individual podiums

1 Asia Canoe Slalom Championship counting for World Cup points

References

Hermann Husslein
1985 births
Living people
Hermann Husslein
Canoeists at the 2012 Summer Olympics
Asian Games medalists in canoeing
Canoeists at the 2010 Asian Games
Canoeists at the 2014 Asian Games
Canoeists at the 2018 Asian Games
Hermann Husslein
Medalists at the 2018 Asian Games
Hermann Husslein